The Review Building is a historic six-story building in Spokane, Washington. It was designed in the Romanesque Revival style, and built with terra cotta in 1891 to house the offices of The Spokesman-Review. It has been listed on the National Register of Historic Places since February 24, 1975.

References

External links

National Register of Historic Places in Spokane County, Washington
Romanesque Revival architecture in Washington (state)
Buildings and structures completed in 1891